Jim Crow laws were state and local laws that enforced racial segregation in the Southern United States.

Jim Crow or Jim Crowe may also refer to:
Jim Crow (character), a persona created by white minstrel show performer Thomas D. Rice
Jim Crow economy, the economic system in parts of the United States where anti-black laws were in force

Places
 Jim Crow, a painted rock in Hunters Quay, Scotland
 Jim Crow Creek (California)
 Jim Crow Creek (Washington)
 Jim Crow goldfield, a mining and agricultural district in central Victoria, Australia
 Mount Jim Crow, in Queensland, Australia, near Rockhampton

People
 James F. Crow (1916–2012), American population geneticist known as "Jim Crow" at University of Wisconsin-Madison
 James Chiles (1833–1873), also known as Jim Crow Chiles, American Confederate outlaw
 Jim Crow (footballer) (1885–1926), Australian rules footballer
 Jim Crowe (footballer) (1909–1979), Australian rules footballer
 Jim Robinson (trombonist) (1892–1976), nicknamed Jim Crow

Arts and entertainment
 Jim Crow, a character in the Disney film Dumbo
 Jim Crow (group), an American rap group
 "Jump Jim Crow", an 1828 traditional slave song adapted and popularized by Thomas D. Rice

Other uses
 Jim crow (tool), a tool for bending rails
 Jim Crow (typeface)
 The New Jim Crow, a 2010 book by Michelle Alexander

See also
 James Crow (disambiguation)
 Juan Crow